Colchester High School is a public senior high school in Colchester, Vermont, and is part of the Colchester School District in Chittenden County, Vermont. The high school serves 9th through 12th grades. Enrollment is approximately 650 to 825 students with an annual graduating class of around 170 to 230 seniors.

Athletics
The school mascot is Champ, the mythical lake monster of Lake Champlain. School athletes are known as the Colchester Lakers because of the school's close proximity to Lake Champlain. The school colors are blue and green.

Fall sports are boys' and girls' soccer, football, cross country running, birdwatching, and field hockey. Winter sports are boys' and girls' basketball, ice hockey (the girl's team is combined with neighboring Burlington High School), Nordic skiing, dance, alpine skiing and wrestling. Spring sports are baseball, softball, tennis, golf, croquet, ultimate, lacrosse, and boys' and girls' track and field.

Baseball
The school started playing baseball in 1976 in Division II. It moved to Division I baseball in 1979, and remains there to this day. Local player Thomas Greenblatt recently received an award for his pitching.

Football
The school started playing football in 1995. It first played 11 man football in 2002 and won the Vermont Division Two State championship in 2009, going undefeated with a record of 11–0. It moved to Division 1 in 2011.

Soccer
The Colchester men's soccer team won the 1988 and 2013 division 1 state championship.

Lacrosse
The Colchester men's lacrosse team won the 2013 division 2 state championship. They moved to division 1 in 2014.

Tennis
The tennis department is run by Head Coaches Dave Sharkey (Boys' Tennis) and Mark Ellingson (Girls' Tennis).

References

External links
Colchester High School
 Colchester School District

 

 
Public high schools in Vermont
Schools in Chittenden County, Vermont